Apollo Theater 03/09/12 is a live album by Bruce Springsteen & The E Street Band, released in November 2014 and was the first official release through the Bruce Springsteen Archives. The concert is available on CD and digital download at http://live.brucespringsteen.net.

Background
The show was recorded at the Apollo Theater in New York City on March 9, 2012 and was a warm-up date for the band's upcoming Wrecking Ball World Tour. The show also marked the first full performance for Springsteen and the E Street Band following the death of Clarence Clemons and the first to feature the newly assembled nine piece backing band that Springsteen would use on his upcoming tours.  The performance was also aired live on E Street Radio.

Track listing
All tracks by Bruce Springsteen, except where noted.

Set one
"Opening Applause" – 1:09
"Bruce Introduction" – 1:07
"We Take Care of Our Own" – 4:28
"Wrecking Ball" – 6:07
"Badlands" – 5:56
"Death to My Hometown" – 4:09
"My City of Ruins" – 12:18
"Talking intro to "The E Street Shuffle" – 0:47
"The E Street Shuffle" – 7:52
"Jack Of All Trades" – 6:13
"Shackled and Drawn" – 6:23
"Waitin' on a Sunny Day" – 5:27
"The Promised Land" – 6:24
"Talking intro to "Mansion on the Hill" – 1:33
"Mansion on the Hill" – 4:28
"Intro to "The Way You Do the Things You Do/634-5789" – 3:31
"The Way You Do the Things You Do/634-5789" – 8:10 (Robinson; Wilson Pickett)
Contains portions of "The Way You Do the Things You Do" Originally Recorded by The Temptations
"The Rising" – 5:10
"We Are Alive" – 6:07
"Thunder Road" – 7:12
"Talking intro to "Rocky Ground" – 1:16

Encore
"Rocky Ground" – 6:40
"Land of Hope and Dreams/People Get Ready" – 8:59 (Springsteen; Mayfield)
Contains portions of "People Get Ready" originally by The Impressions
"Tenth Avenue Freeze-Out" – 6:33
"Hold On, I'm Comin'" – 3:43 (Hayes, Porter)
Originally Recorded by Sam & Dave

Personnel

Bruce Springsteen – guitar, vocals, harmonica
Nils Lofgren – rhythm guitar, lead guitar, pedal steel guitar, acoustic guitar, background vocals
Patti Scialfa – background vocals, some duet vocals, acoustic guitar, occasional tambourine
Roy Bittan – piano, backing vocals
Garry Tallent – bass guitar
Steven Van Zandt – guitar, slide guitar, backing vocals
Max Weinberg – drums
Soozie Tyrell – violin, acoustic guitar, percussion, background vocals
Charles Giordano – organ, accordion, electronic glockenspiel, rare piano, occasional background vocals
Jake Clemons – saxophone, percussion, background vocals
Eddie Manion – saxophone, percussion
Curt Ramm – trumpet, percussion
Barry Danielian – trumpet, percussion
Clark Gayton – trombone, tuba, percussion
Curtis King – background vocals, tambourine
Cindy Mizelle – background vocals, tambourine
Michelle Moore – background vocals, rapping on "Rocky Ground"
Everett Bradley – percussion, background vocals
Bob Clearmountain – mixer
Bob Ludwig – mastering

References

2014 live albums
Bruce Springsteen Archives